Pac-Man Museum + is a 2022 compilation video game developed by Now Production and published by Bandai Namco Entertainment. Being a sequel to the 2014 compilation title Pac-Man Museum, Pac-Man Museum + includes 14 games from the Pac-Man series, with additional features such as missions and online leaderboards.

The compilation was released worldwide on May 27, 2022 on Windows via Steam, Nintendo Switch, PlayStation 4, and Xbox One.

Overview 
Like the previous collection, Pac-Man Museum + features fourteen games from the Pac-Man franchise, ranging from arcade titles to home console/handheld releases. These games are presented as playable machines in a virtual arcade, where the player can control Pac-Man and explore. The classic games are playable via modified emulation, while some of the modern games are source ports. Select games in the collection are locked upon first startup, and require the player to complete two play sessions of specific games. The game features an in-game currency system known as coins. Coins can be earned by obtaining high scores or by completing missions in games, and can be spent to play the arcade games in the collection, as well as to purchase objects from a vending machine and gashapon capsules at a gashapon machine. These items can be placed throughout the arcade to customize it to the player's liking. Additional features include a CRT filter, save points for select classic games and online leaderboards.

Games featured 

Pac-Man Arrangement (2005) lacks the two-player mode found in the original game, similar to previous ports of the game.

Production and release 
Pac-Man Museum + was originally announced on social media platforms by Bandai Namco Entertainment on November 19, 2021, slated for an early 2022 release. On February 25, 2022, Famitsu announced a livestream showcasing first "hands-on" footage of Pac-Man Museum +, which was streamed on March 4, 2022. On February 28, 2022, the game was given a May 27, 2022 release date through social media announcements, alongside the game scheduled to be included on Xbox Game Pass the day it launches. In Japan, the game was scheduled to launch on Steam on May 28, 2022; the release moved a day earlier on May 25, 2022.

The versions of Pac-Land, Pac-In-Time and Pac-Attack in the collection are modified to remove any references of Ms. Pac-Man appearing in-game, with the Pac-Mom character created specifically for the game taking her place instead – as previously seen in the Arcade Archives re-release of Pac-Land, released a month earlier. The designs for Pac-Baby (named Pac-Sis in the collection) and Jr. Pac-Man (named Pac-Boy in the collection) have also been altered to remove resemblance to Ms. Pac-Man, as well as Chomp-Chomp's name being altered to Pac-Buddy. While it hasn't been officially clarified to why the changes were made, it is assumed to be tied to Ms. Pac-Man's ongoing AtGames dispute.

Reception 

Pac-Man Museum + received "mixed or average" reviews according to review aggregator Metacritic.

Nintendo Life gave the title an 8 out of 10 and praised its emulation quality, interesting overworld setup, missions, online leaderboards, and the comprehensive collection of Pac-Man's history while criticizing the implementation of the CRT filter, the arcade overworld framerate, and a vertical synchronization issue present in Pac-Land. Push Square thought favorably of the large variety of games, interactive wrapper, and emulation quality, but took minor issue with input lag and a few poor game selections.

See also 
 List of Namco video game compilations

References

External links 
Official website (Japanese)

2022 video games
Bandai Namco games
Bandai Namco video game compilations
Multiplayer and single-player video games
Nintendo Switch games
Now Production games
Pac-Man
PlayStation 4 games
PlayStation Network games
Video games developed in Japan
Windows games
Xbox One games
ja:パックマンミュージアム